Tiso is a surname.  Notable people with this name include:

 Davide Tiso (born 1979), Italian musician
 Francis Tiso (born 1950), American Catholic scholar
 Jozef Tiso (1887–1947), Slovak priest and political leader executed for war crimes
 Paula Tiso (born 1963), American voice actress
 Štefan Tiso (1897–1959), Slovak lawyer
 Wagner Tiso (born 1945), Brazilian musician

Slovak-language surnames
Surnames of Italian origin